Lester Legrant Bond (October 27, 1829 – April 15, 1903) was a member of the Illinois state House of Representatives from 1866 to 1870 and served as acting Mayor of Chicago, appointed by Joseph Medill in 1873 when Medill left for Europe.

Biography
Bond was born to Jonas and Elizabeth Bond. and grew up on his father's farm in Ravenna, Ohio. He received his law degree in 1853 and traveled to Chicago the following year. In 1854, he formed a legal partnership with A.S. Seaton. By 1858, he had partnered with E.A. West, a law firm which remained until 1891 when it became Bond & West.

Bond was one of the founders of the Republican party in Chicago. In 1862 and 1864, he was elected a Chicago alderman, representing the 11th Ward. In 1867, he became a member of the Illinois General Assembly, and served until 1871. Bond also served on the Chicago Board of Education. Bond rejoined the Chicago City Council in 1871. and served through 1873. During this time, when Chicago Mayor and newspaper publisher Joseph Medill traveled to Europe in 1873, Medill named Bond acting mayor of Chicago on August 18, 1873. Bond assumed the office on August 22. When Medill's term expired that same year, Bond ran for mayor as an independent on a law and order platform, supporting laws which would ban the sale of liquor on Sundays.  He was defeated by Harvey Colvin, who won with 60% of the voted despite Bond receiving the endorsements of all Chicago newspapers except the Times.

Bond married Mary Aspenwall and they had one daughter, Laura, who was born in 1867.

He died at his home in Chicago on April 15, 1903, and was buried at Rosehill Cemetery.

References

1829 births
1903 deaths
People from Ravenna, Ohio
Burials at Rosehill Cemetery
Mayors of Chicago
Chicago City Council members
Members of the Illinois House of Representatives
19th-century American politicians
Members of the Chicago Board of Education